UAT may refer to:

 Unit auxiliary transformer, step-down transformer supplies voltage to auxiliary loads of power station 
 Correcaminos UAT, a Mexican association football club based in Ciudad Victoria, Tamaulipas
 Union Aéromaritime de Transport, a former French airline which became Union des Transports Aériens after merging with Transports Aériens Intercontinentaux in 1963
 Universal Access Transceiver, a physical link proposed for the Automatic Dependent Surveillance-Broadcast (ADS-B) aviation technology
 University of Advancing Technology, a private for-profit university located in Tempe, Arizona
 University of Alabama, located in Tuscaloosa, Alabama, one of three public universities in the University of Alabama system
 Universidad Autónoma de Tamaulipas, public university in the state of Tamaulipas, Mexico
 User acceptance testing, a process of verifying that a system meets mutually agreed-upon requirements